"Deportee (Plane Wreck at Los Gatos)" is a protest song with lyrics by Woody Guthrie and music by Martin Hoffman detailing the January 28, 1948 crash of a plane near Los Gatos Canyon,  west of Coalinga in Fresno County, California, United States.  The crash occurred in Los Gatos Canyon and not in the town of Los Gatos itself, which is in Santa Clara County, approximately 150 miles away.  Guthrie was inspired to write the song by what he considered the racist mistreatment of the passengers before and after the accident.  The crash resulted in the deaths of 32 people, 4 Americans and 28 migrant farm workers who were being deported from California back to Mexico.

History 

The genesis of "Deportee (Plane Wreck at Los Gatos)" reportedly occurred when Guthrie was struck by the fact that radio and newspaper coverage of the Los Gatos plane crash did not give the victims' names, but instead referred to them merely as "deportees".  Guthrie lived in New York City at the time, and none of the deportees' names were printed in the January 29, 1948, New York Times report, only those of the flight crew and the security guard. However, the local newspaper, The Fresno Bee, covered the tragedy extensively and listed all of the known names of the deportees.

Unaware of the extensive local coverage of the disaster, Guthrie responded with a poem, which, when it was first written, featured only rudimentary musical accompaniment, with Guthrie chanting the song rather than singing it. In the poem, Guthrie assigned symbolic names to the dead: "Goodbye to my Juan, goodbye Rosalita; adiós, mis amigos, Jesús y María..."  A decade later, Guthrie's poem was set to music and given a haunting melody by a schoolteacher named Martin Hoffman.  Shortly after, folk singer Pete Seeger, a friend of Woody Guthrie, began performing the song at concerts, and it was Seeger's rendition that popularized the song during this time.

It has been suggested by the Three Rocks Research website that, in fact, "Deportee (Plane Wreck at Los Gatos)" betrays Guthrie's lack of understanding regarding the Bracero Program. The program was a series of laws and diplomatic agreements created by the U.S. Congress in 1942, that permitted Mexican farm laborers (or Braceros) to work in the United States due to the severe labor shortages caused by World War II.  Under the terms of the program, the labor contractors were expected to provide transportation to and from the Mexican border, with the U.S. Immigration Service being required to repatriate the Mexican citizens if the contractor defaulted.  As such, the "deportation" of Braceros in this fashion was simply a way of meeting the obligations of the program—although some newspapers, e.g., the New York Times, did refer to the braceros as "deportees".  However, the presence in the song of the lines, "Some of us are illegal, and some are not wanted/Our work contract's out and we have to move on." suggests that Guthrie did in fact understand the workings of the Bracero Program. Furthermore, it could be argued that Guthrie's song is less about the program itself and more a comment on the attitude of American society and the media towards the Mexican farm laborers.

In addition to being a lament for the braceros killed in the crash, the opening lines of "Deportee (Plane Wreck at Los Gatos)":

The crops are all in and the peaches are rott'ning,
The oranges piled in their creosote dumps.

are another protest by Guthrie.  At the time, government policies paid farmers to destroy their crops in order to keep farm production and prices high.  Guthrie felt that it was wrong to render food inedible by poisoning it in a world where hungry people lived.

"Deportee (Plane Wreck at Los Gatos)" has been described by journalist Joe Klein as "the last great song he [Guthrie] would write, a memorial to the nameless migrants 'all scattered like dry leaves' in Los Gatos Canyon".  The song has been recorded many times, often under a variety of other titles, including "Deportees", "Ballad of the Deportees", "Deportee Song", "Plane Crash at Los Gatos" and "Plane Wreck at Los Gatos (Deportee)".

Recordings 

The song has been recorded by many artists, including:
 Dave Guard and the Whiskey Hill Singers (featuring Judy Henske) on Dave Guard and the Whiskey Hill Singers (1962).
 The Kingston Trio on Time To Think (1963).
 Cisco Houston on Cisco Sings the Songs of Woody Guthrie (1963).
 Judy Collins on Judy Collins #3 (1964), and the live album A Tribute to Woody Guthrie (1972).
 Odetta on album Odetta Sings of Many Things (1964).
 Julie Felix on her first album Julie Felix (1964).
 The Brothers Four on Sing of Our Times (1964).
 Joni Mitchell: a 1964 live recording on the Joni Mitchell Archives – Vol. 1: The Early Years (1963–1967) (2020)
 The Byrds on the Ballad of Easy Rider (1969).
 Joan Baez on Blessed Are... (1971) and live on Bowery Songs (2004).
 Paddy Reilly on The Life of Paddy Reilly (1971).
 Nana Mouskouri in a French translation with title "Adieu mes amis" on Le Tournesol (1970).
 The Bergerfolk on The Bergerfolk Sing For Joy, Smithsonian Folkways Recordings (1973).
 Barbara Dane on I Hate the Capitalist System (1973).
 Arlo Guthrie on Arlo Guthrie (1974) and with Pete Seeger on Arlo Guthrie and Pete Seeger: Together in Concert (1975).
 Edoardo Bennato on Naiadi summer (1975).
 Bob Dylan and Joan Baez during the 2nd Part of the Rolling Thunder Revue (1976).
 David Carradine on Bound for Glory (motion picture soundtrack) (1976).
 Max Boyce on The Road and the Miles (1977).
 Dolly Parton on 9 to 5 and Odd Jobs (1980).
 Sweet Honey in the Rock on The Other Side (1985).
 Christy Moore on, The Spirit of Freedom (1985).
 The Highwaymen, with Johnny Rodriguez, on Highwayman (1985).
 Christina Lindberg on Stanna stanna (1985), in as "Flyktingarna" ("The Refugees") with lyrics by Jens Lizel.
 Hoyt Axton on Hard Travelin''' (1986).
 Rory McLeod on Woody Lives!' (1987).
 Gene Clark on So Rebellious a Lover (1987), with Carla Olson.
 James Talley on Woody Guthrie and Songs of my Oklahoma Home recorded 1994 released 1999
 Peter, Paul and Mary on Lifelines (1995) and Lifelines Live (1996).
 Concrete Blonde on Concrete Blonde y Los Illegals (1997).
 Nanci Griffith with an ensemble including Lucinda Williams, Tish Hinojosa, Odetta, Steve Earle, and John Stewart on Other Voices, Too (A Trip Back to Bountiful) (1998).
 Los Super Seven on Los Super Seven (1998).
 Svante Karlsson on American Songs as "Deportees (Plane Wreck at Los Gatos/Goodbye Juan)" (1999).
 Bruce Springsteen on 'Til We Outnumber 'Em (2000).
 Ox on Dust Bowl Revival (2003).
 Derek Warfield and the Wolfe Tones on 50 Great Irish Rebel Songs and Ballads (2005).
 Joe Jencks Rise As One (2005).
 The Battlefield Band on The Road of Tears (2006).
 Billy Bragg on Talking with the Taxman about Poetry extended edition (2006).
 Roy Brown Ramírez, Tito Auger, and Tao Rodríguez-Seeger on Que Vaya Bien (2006; in Spanish).
 Richard Shindell on, South of Delia (2007).
 Old Crow Medicine Show on Song of America (2007).
 Joel Rafael on "Joel Rafael The Songs of Woody Guthrie Vol. 1 & 2" (2008).
 John Stewart "Illegals/Deportee Medley" on Secret Tapes 1984-87 (2009).
 Tim Broadbent on "Crisis" (2011).
 Dan Bern on Live in New York (2011).
 John McCutcheon on This Land: Woody Guthrie's America (2011).
 Outernational and Tom Morello: The Nightwatchman on Todos Somos Ilegales (2011).
 Deacon Blue on The Rest (2012).
 KT Tunstall as part of ONE's agit8 campaign (2013).
 Tim Z. Hernandez with Lance Canales & the Flood as a single (2013).
 Tish Hinojosa in After the Fair (2013; in Spanish).
 The Last Internationale on "This Bootleg Kills... Vol. 1" (2015).
 Lance Canales on The Blessing And The Curse (2015).
 Sneezy Waters and his Very Fine Band on Live (2017).
 Joan Baez on her 4 Voices Tour with Mary Chapin Carpenter and Indigo Girls(2017).
 Dave Alvin and Jimmie Dale Gilmore on Downey to Lubbock'' (2018).
 Joan Baez on her final global Fare Thee Well tour (2018-2019).

Notes

External links 
Deportee (Plane Wreck at Los Gatos) song lyrics at woodyguthrie.org
Check-Six.com - The "Plane Wreck at Los Gatos" Canyon (includes full passenger and crew list)
All They Will Call You by Tim Z. Hernandez a book about the crash

1948 songs
Deportation
Woody Guthrie songs
Joan Baez songs
Peter, Paul and Mary songs
Protest songs
Songs about California
Songs based on actual events
Songs written by Woody Guthrie
Songs against racism and xenophobia
Arlo Guthrie songs